James "Joey" Caverly (born in 1988 or 1989) is an American actor who has been deaf since birth.

Personal life 
Caverly was born and raised in Royal Oak, Michigan. He has been deaf since birth and has an older sister who is also deaf, as well as two younger brothers who are hearing; his parents are hearing, as well. 

In 2007, Caverly graduated from Lahser High School, a mainstream school in the Bloomfield Hills School District with a program for deaf and hard of hearing students. In 2011, he received a Bachelor of Arts in Theatre Arts from Gallaudet University.

Caverly currently lives in New York City.

Career 
After graduating from Gallaudet University, Caverly joined National Theatre of the Deaf, where he both directed and acted in plays for two years.

Following his time with National Theatre of the Deaf, Caverly performed with Huntington Theatre Company, Berkeley Repertory Theatre, Studio Theatre, Kitchen Theatre Company, and SpeakEasy Stage Company. In 2018, he performed in a Broadway production of Children Of A Lesser God with Studio 54. 

Aside from acting, Caverly has also directed plays, including a production of Romeo and Juliet in both American Sign Language and spoken English for Community College of Baltimore County Community Theatre.

Portrayals of deafness in media 
As a deaf person who interacts with the media, Caverly has spoken publicly about the lack of accurate representation of deafness in film and television, as well as on stage. He has discussed how, in many media portrayals, the deaf person is "the problem, they’re the issue in the story that needs to be fixed," which is not "the lens that the world needs to see." 

Although he has experienced some barriers to his acting career due to his deafness, Caverly has stated, "As a deaf person I’m already invested in communicating through my body ... And when I’m on stage it’s really easy for me to find that piece of emotion because I do it on a day to day basis."

Through Only Murders in the Building he had the opportunity to craft and artfully act as a complex deaf character. Caverly has previously indicated, "there are one too many creators who write disabled characters as two-dimensional: fixating on their disability without room for growth." However, Caverly worked with series co-creator John Hoffman and director Cherien Dabis "to figure out how to portray Theo authentically without feeling like a gimmick. Aside from the dialogue changes, [the trio] talked about how a deaf person views the world," making the character creation "a true collaborative effort between the creators and [Caverly] to bring the character to life."

In 2021, the series included an episode that had only one line of dialogue and featured Caverly's character. When asked about the episode, Caverly said, "Framing the entire episode in the perspective of a Deaf person is a subversive act" because "[i]t forces the audience to listen closely, but with their eyes instead of ears." In crafting the episode, Caverly worked closely with director Cherien Dabis to more accurately represent his experiences as a deaf person, including camera angles. Additionally, the episode's screenwriters, Stephen Markley and Ben Philippe, shied away from making Caverly's character too "exceptional," indicating that people with disabilities, much like able-bodied people, are imperfect but not villainous.

Caverly appeared in the second season of Only Murders in the Building and further highlighted the existing misrepresentation of deafness in media. Importantly, Caverly's and Selena Gomez's characters attempt to converse with one another, but Gomez's character does not know sign language. Caverly's character informs her that he can only catch about a third of what she says based on reading lips. This scene, in particular, is important because "Communication is something that, when Deaf people are present on-screen, usually isn’t perceived as a problem when it is." 

After working on Only Murders in the Building, Caverly has stated that he is ready to explore more roles that do not fixate on the character's hearing loss, especially when the character's deafness does not elevate the plot. He asserts that "true inclusion would mean more disabled people in the writing room, behind the camera, and on the production team." Including disabled people in every step of the process would, he claims, help to "dismantle" the "tired portrayal of disabled characters on TV."

Awards and honors 
The Only Murders in the Building episode "The Boy from 6B" was given the Seal of Authentic Representation from the Ruderman Family Foundation for Caverly's portrayal of Theo, as an actor with a disability and at least five lines of dialogue.

In 2022, Caverly was predicted to receive an Emmy Award nomination for his role on Only Murders in the Building, which would have made him the first deaf actor to be nominated, though he did not receive a nomination.

Filmography

Stage performances

References

External links 

 Official website

Living people
Male actors from Michigan
21st-century American male actors
American male deaf actors
People from  Royal Oak, Michigan
Gallaudet University alumni
1980s births